Carolyn Omine is an American television writer.

She won four Emmy Awards for her writing work on The Simpsons.

Writing credits

The Simpsons episodes 
Omine has written the following episodes:

"Little Big Mom" (2000)
"Treehouse of Horror XI" ("Night of the Dolphin") (2000)
"The Great Money Caper" (2000)
"Treehouse of Horror XII" ("Wiz Kids") (2001)
"Sweets and Sour Marge" (2002)
"Strong Arms of the Ma" (2003)
"Smart & Smarter" (2004)
"A Star Is Torn" (2005)
"Ice Cream of Margie (with the Light Blue Hair)" (2006)
"The Homer of Seville" (2007)
"Dial 'N' for Nerder" (with William Wright as co-writer) (2008)
"The Great Wife Hope" (2009)
"Chief of Hearts" (with William Wright as co-writer) (2010)
"Treehouse of Horror XXII" (2011)
"To Cur with Love" (2012)
"Luca$" (2014)
"Blazed and Confused" (with William Wright as co-writer) (2014)
"Halloween of Horror" (2015)
"Gal of Constant Sorrow" (2016)
"Looking for Mr. Goodbart" (2017)
"Werking Mom" (with Robin Sayers as co-writer) (2018)
"Highway to Well" (2020)
"The Way of the Dog" (2020)
"The Man from G.R.A.M.P.A." (2021)
"My Octopus and a Teacher" (2022)
"Treehouse of Horror XXXIII" (2022) (with Ryan Koh and Matt Selman as co-writers)

Full House episodes 

Omine has written the following episodes:

"Smash Club: The Next Generation" (1993)
"Is It True About Stephanie" (1994)
"A House Divided (1994)" (Teleplay with Adam I. Lapidus)
"Making Out Is Hard To Do" (1994)
"Arrest Ye Merry Gentlemen" (1994)
"All Stood Up (1995)" (Teleplay with Adam I. Lapidus)
"Michelle Rides Again" (1995) (Teleplay)

References

External links 
 

Living people
American television writers
American women television writers
American television producers
American women television producers
Year of birth missing (living people)
Place of birth missing (living people)
Screenwriters from Hawaii